Nullarbor (Nullabor is a common misspelling) can refer to:

Places:
 Nullarbor Plain in southern Australia (this includes information about the Nullarbor bioregion)
 Nullarbor, South Australia, a locality

It can also refer to:
Nullarbor Nymph, an Australian hoax
Nullarbor (demo party), or the Nullarbor Digital Content Competition, based in Perth, Western Australia

See also
Nullarbor Links, a golf course  in South Australia and Western Australia
Nullarbor National Park, a protected area in South Australia
Nullarbor Regional Reserve, a protected area in South Australia
Nullarbor Wilderness Protection Area, a protected area in South Australia